The women's 100 metres hurdles event at the 2016 African Championships in Athletics was held on 22 and 23 June in Kings Park Stadium.

Medalists

Results

Heats
Qualification: First 3 of each heat (Q) and the next 2 fastest (q) qualified for the final.

Wind:Heat 1: +0.5 m/s, Heat 2: +1.2 m/s

Final
Wind: +1.6 m/s

References

2016 African Championships in Athletics
Sprint hurdles at the African Championships in Athletics
2016 in women's athletics